Scottish Aviation Limited was an aircraft manufacturer based at Prestwick, Scotland.

History
The company was founded in 1935. Originally a flying school operator, the company took on maintenance work in 1938.
During the Second World War, Scottish Aviation was involved in aircraft fitting for the war effort. This included maintenance and conversion of the Consolidated Liberator bomber.

The factory building of Scottish Aviation, which still exists today, was formerly the Palace of Engineering at the 1938 Empire Exhibition in Bellahouston Park, Glasgow. The building was dismantled from its Glasgow site and reconstructed.

Post-war it built robust military STOL utility aircraft such as the Pioneer and larger Twin Pioneer. Much later the company built some Jetstream turboprop transport and navigational training aircraft following the collapse of Handley Page (which designed the type). It built Bulldog trainers after the demise of their original manufacturer, Beagle Aircraft Limited.

In November 1958, redundancies affecting almost 800 of their 2,500 staff were announced. Scottish Aviation merged with the British Aircraft Corporation, Hawker Siddeley Aviation, and Hawker Siddeley Dynamics to form British Aerospace in 1977. Much of the former Scottish Aviation assets now belong to Spirit AeroSystems.

Aircraft
(first flight in brackets)
Scottish Aviation Pioneer (5 November 1947)
Scottish Aviation Twin Pioneer (25 June 1955)
Scottish Aviation Bulldog
Scottish Aviation Jetstream

Gallery

Cars

Between 1964 and 1966 Scottish Aviation designed a small battery-electric car, the Scottish Aviation Scamp, of which twelve pre-production examples were built.

See also
 Aerospace industry in the United Kingdom

References

Citations

Bibliography

 Jackson, A.J. British Civil Aircraft since 1919 (Volume 3). London, Putnam, 1974.

Further reading
 Berry, P (2005) Prestwick Airport and Scottish Aviation
 Robertson, A (1986) Lion Rampant and Winged

External links

 Scottish Aviation – BAE Systems
Scottish Aviation – British Aircraft Directory

Defunct aircraft manufacturers of Scotland
South Ayrshire
1935 establishments in Scotland
Vehicle manufacturing companies established in 1935
1977 disestablishments in Scotland
Vehicle manufacturing companies disestablished in 1977
Companies based in South Ayrshire
Car manufacturers of the United Kingdom
Defunct motor vehicle manufacturers of Scotland
Battery electric vehicle manufacturers
Electric vehicle manufacturers of the United Kingdom
British companies disestablished in 1977
British companies established in 1935